Typha incana  is a plant species native to the eastern part of European Russia and to Western Siberia (За́падно-Сиби́рский экономи́ческий райо́н). The species grows in freshwater marshes and along banks of rivers and lakes.

References

incana
Freshwater plants
Flora of East European Russia
Flora of West Siberia
Plants described in 2008